The Henry was an automobile built in Muskegon, Michigan by the Henry Motor Car Company from 1910 to 1912.  The first model built was a five-seat tonneau with a 35 hp engine which sold for $1,750.  Both 20 hp and 40 hp engines were made available in 1911, and these were available in five body styles.  The 1911 two-seater roadster had running-board mounted toolboxes.

References
 

Defunct motor vehicle manufacturers of the United States
Motor vehicle manufacturers based in Michigan
Muskegon, Michigan
Defunct manufacturing companies based in Michigan